Albert Rupprecht (born 10 June 1968) is a German politician of the Christian Social Union (CSU) who has been serving as a member of the Bundestag from the state of Bavaria since 2002.

He represents Weiden.

Political career 
Rupprecht first became a member of the Bundestag in the 2002 German federal election. He is a member of the Committee for Education, Research and Technology Assessment. Since 2009, he has been the CDU/CSU parliamentary group's spokesperson on education and research.

In the negotiations to form a fourth coalition government under Chancellor Angela Merkel following the 2017 federal elections, Rupprecht was part of the working group on education policy, led by Annegret Kramp-Karrenbauer, Stefan Müller and Hubertus Heil.

Political positions
In June 2017, Rupprecht voted against Germany's introduction of same-sex marriage.

References

External links 

  
 Bundestag biography 

1968 births
Living people
Members of the Bundestag for Bavaria
Members of the Bundestag 2021–2025
Members of the Bundestag 2017–2021
Members of the Bundestag 2013–2017
Members of the Bundestag 2009–2013
Members of the Bundestag 2005–2009
Members of the Bundestag 2002–2005
People from Neustadt an der Waldnaab (district)
Members of the Bundestag for the Christian Social Union in Bavaria